NKR may refer to:
Nagorno-Karabakh Republic, the former name for the Republic of Artsakh, a de facto independent state in the Nagorno-Karabakh disputed region
Nandamuri Kalyan Ram, Telugu film actor, known by his initials, NKR
National Kidney Registry, a US national registry for kidney transplanting
Norwegian krone
Nukuoro language